Ayr Seaforth Athletic Club is an athletics club located in Ayr, Scotland. The club trains at Dam Park track, situated outside Ayr College. The club hosts a club championship every year that allows up-and-coming athletes to compete against their teammates to see who has progressed the most through the year. Ayr Seaforth is Ayr's only athletics club offering athletes both young and old the opportunity to take part in many aspects of athletics. Seaforth has a very strong road running club but is also a strong track and field event club. Dam park track is made up of tartan track; the track has a signature red color it. This track runs for 400 m with eight lanes around the full length, along with this Dam park also hosts a high jump area, a triple jump pit, a long jump pit, a shot put area, a javelin area, a hammer throw area and a football pitch.

Notable athletes
Brian Whittle is a British athlete who competed in both the 1986 European Championships in Athletics and the 1994 European Championships in Athletics; in both of these races he won gold. During his youth, he ran at Ayr Seaforth and Enfield Athletics club, where he began to train for the 4 × 400 metres relay; he since has moved to Enfield and Haringey Athletic Club.

Many other athletes have competed at national and international level.

Training provided
Ayr seaforth has a number of very skilled and talented coaches that will give up their own time to help train the athletes to get them at their peak condition. The coaching has been split up into various classes; coaches will provide support in their chosen fields. The sprint team has a sprint coach and so on. The training that the coaches provide allows new athletes to improve the way in which they train and run.

Track and field
For track and field athletes, the training regime is for two hours every Tuesday and Thursday, during the winter training period athletes are asked to take part in specialist winter training. The winter training helps boost an athlete's endurance and stamina by getting athletes to go hill running (this usually takes place on Sundays). The track and field training usually have sessions of light speed training and heavy sets of endurance training this will allow the athlete to gain valuable skills to allow them to compete at a club or national level.

Road running
Participants in road running for Ayr Seaforth meet up twice a week to train on the track at Dam Park Stadium and then usually once a week participate physically in road running. Road running is considered to be long-distance running and Ayr Seaforth usually consider road running distance to me around 6–10 miles. When training, many road runners will run large distances around the town of Ayr. The athletes usually keep to pavements when training.

Cross country
The club does not offer any specific training for cross country. However, during summer, Ayr Seaforth run off-road around the River Ayr and Auchincruive area. There are also many cross country competitions and relays during the winter season. Many younger runners are encouraged to begin training for cross country before specializing in a specific track and field event. Much of the cross country takes place in local outdoor areas.

Training grounds
Ayr Seaforth train at Dam Park Stadium, which is an athletics facility operated by South Ayrshire Council and located less than a mile from Ayr town centre. It consists of an eight-lane trace with polymeric surface which was resurfaced in July 2002, and holds a provision for field events, such as long jump, high jump and javelin. The Stadium's field area is often used to hold football matches.

The Pavilion in Dam Park has five changing rooms, two toilet and shower blocks, two storerooms for equipment and a general purpose area. There is a seating capacity of 478 spectators in the pavilion and also a press box.

The stadium is mainly used for athletics coaching and football events, nevertheless a wide range of outdoor activities can be accommodated. Music festivals, such as Jam At The Dam, fire safety events and dog trials have previously taken place at Dam Park. (Jam at The Dam)

Events
Club Championship - the yearly club race meeting which consists of track and field events. Mainly Sprint(running), Long jump, Triple jump, Steeplechase(athletics), High jump, shot put.

Turkey trot - a 10 km road race held just after Christmas to give road racing athletes a bit of a challenge. Organised by Ayrodynamic Triathlon Club.

Scottish Juniors - an event that allows younger runners (Under-18s) compete against athletes of their own age as well as similar talents or skills.

UK School Games - an event that allows school children to compete in possibly their first large-scale event.

5 KM series - an event usually taking place along Ayr shore front, (usually for road running athletes) as the name implies the length of the course is 5 km however there is also a 3 km run available as well.

There are many cross country events that allow athletes compete across Scotland; some of these are:
 National Cross Country Relay
 Ayrshire Cross Country Championships
. West District Cross Country Relays
. Club Cross Country Championship
. Scottish Road Relay Championships
. Scottish Junior Road Relay Championships
. Scottish Schools Cross Country Championships
. National Cross Country Championships

History

Ayr Seaforth has had many successes through its history. Little is known about the origins of the club but it appears that the club was established around the 1950s. Since that time the training grounds have had many improvements made to them, allowing the club to train at Dam Park. Last year, South Ayrshire council began to resurface the track as it was badly in need of repair; this work was completed shortly after it began and allowed the club to begin training at Dam Park once again.

Presentation Night

This is an event where the athletes are honored for their hard work and many receive awards for dedication and success in track and field events, cross country events and road races. This event is usually held at a local hotel where the athletes can enjoy a night relaxing instead of training. Many of the club trophies are also distributed on this night, such as best male athlete, best female athlete and best in club.

Membership
When an athlete becomes a member at Ayr seaforth they are then able to compete for the club at either club level or national level. This also means the athlete can wear club colors when competing, Ayr seaforth colors consist of a white vest with a red cross. These colors also resemble the club logo. Membership usually consists of a once a year fee, this fee is used to help cover club costs such as upkeep and insurance for the athletes using the facilities. All coaches are volunteers and give up their time to help develop young athletes.

References

External links
Ayr Seaforth Official Website
Ayr Seaforth's power of 10 rankings
South Ayrshire's official website
United Kingdom Athletics official website

Sport in Ayr
Athletics clubs in Scotland